Wanda Cinemas is a cinema operator in China, headquartered in the Wanda Plaza (万达广场) in Chaoyang District, Beijing. It is a part of the Dalian Wanda Group. As of 2014 Wang Jianlin is the head of the company. As of January 2018, Wanda Cinema remained China's largest film distributor. Some locations are named Wanda International Cinemas with Hollywood and Chinese movies as the main menu.

As January, 2018, Wanda Cinema had 525 cinemas with 4648 screens worldwide. The revenue in 2017 is 13.2 billion yuan.

History
The company was founded in 2005.

In 2014 the company had 4.2 billion yuan ($681.7 million) in box office revenue, the highest grossing in China. In 2014 the China Securities Regulatory Commission gave approval for the company's IPO.

As of 2014, the company had a total of 1,616 screens, including 94 IMAX screens, in 182 cinema complexes in almost 100 cities in China, making it the largest movie theater operator in Asia. As of December 2015, the number of screens has since risen to an estimated 2,000 screens.

In June 2015, Wanda Cinemas announced that it had acquired Australian cinema chain Hoyts. On July 27, 2016, the company announced it would acquire film website Mtime.

In 2016, the total box office of Wanda Cinema is 7.6 billion RMB, with a 20.5% increasing.

As of April 2017, Wanda Cinema remained China's largest film distributor. The Financial Times reported on April 1, 2017, that Wanda Cinema had "reported a 7.5 per cent year-on-year increase in annual net profit."

In November 2017, Wanda Cinemas won the 2017 "China Top 100 Enterprises Award ".

On February 5, Wanda Group signed a strategic investment agreement with Alibaba Group and Cultural Investment Holdings. The 2 parties will invest 7.8 billion yuan for Wanda Film Holding's 12.77% stake. Of which, Alibaba invests 4.68 billion yuan and CIS invests 3.12 billion yuan, becoming the second and third largest shareholders after transaction. Wanda Group remains the controlling shareholder with 48.09% of shares in Wanda Film.

On June 25, 2018, Wanda has unveiled plans to consolidate its film and entertainment businesses with the aim of boosting production of films, television and games. In a company notice issued to the Shenzhen Stock Exchange, Wanda Film Holdings, a subsidiary of Dalian Wanda Group, said it plans to acquire a 96.83% stake of Wanda Media from the company's 21 shareholders at a price of 11.6 billion yuan ($1.77 billion) via cash payment and share issue.

Facilities and operations

Wanda Cinemas is headquartered in the Wanda Plaza in Chaoyang District, Beijing. Beijing CBD Wanda Plaza houses the company headquarters and includes the Beijing CBD Wanda Cinemas (北京万达电影城CBD店).

Some locations are named Wanda International Cinemas. As of 2016, it has a total of 2,789 screens in 320 theaters in China, Australia and New Zealand. As of June 2016, it was the largest exhibitor in China, with 2,700 screens in 311 theaters.

In 2018, Shanghai Wujiaochang Wanda Cinema introduced the very first LED cinema screen in China. The LED cinema screen has a width of nearly 10.3 meters, ultra-clear 4K resolution, with its peak brightness 10 times higher than traditional projection equipment.

See also
List of cinema and movie theater chains
List of IMAX venues

References

External links

 Wanda Cinemas 
 Wanda Cinemas 

Cinema chains in China
Companies based in Beijing
Chaoyang District, Beijing
Chinese companies established in 2005
Entertainment companies established in 2005
Chinese brands
Dalian Wanda Group
Companies listed on the Shenzhen Stock Exchange